The 1996 ITT Automotive Grand Prix of Detroit was a CART race which happened at the Belle Isle Park. It happened on June 9, 1996. It was the 8th round of the 1996 IndyCar season.

Race

Lap 2
Christian Fittipaldi takes the lead from Scott Pruett.

Lap 4
Top 6: Christian Fittipaldi, Gil de Ferran, Paul Tracy, Scott Pruett, Robby Gordon and Michael Andretti. First full course caution was out after Gordon had hit the tire wall. Green flag came out on lap 10.

Lap 13
Top 12: Christian Fittipaldi, Gil de Ferran, Paul Tracy, Michael Andretti, Scott Pruett, André Ribeiro, Adrian Fernandez, Al Unser Jr., Bobby Rahal, Parker Johnstone, Mark Blundell and Alex Zanardi.

Some laps later
Second full course caution, as Greg Moore and André Ribeiro crashed. Neither the Canadian, nor the Brazilian had retired. One lap later, Gil de Ferran spun after leaving the pits.

Lap 25
Top 6: Christian Fittipaldi, Michael Andretti, Paul Tracy, Gil de Ferran, Al Unser Jr. and Bobby Rahal. Green flag came out on lap 31.

Laps 36-37
At the very same curve, Emerson Fittipaldi and André Ribeiro crashed, but not simultaneously. Fittipaldi brushed the wall on lap 36. Ribeiro would do the same on the following lap. Both drivers retired.

Lap 46
Shades of 1994 came out, as Al Unser Jr. and Paul Tracy once again were involved into a crash. Two years before, both drivers collided, as Little Al went into the tyre barrier. The same fate happened on lap 46 of the 1996 race. Third caution was out. Green flag came out on lap 53.

Lap 57
Top 6: Christian Fittipaldi, Andretti, de Ferran, Rahal, Tracy and Pruett.

Lap 61
Fourth caution was out, as Bobby Rahal had a hard crash.

Lap 65
Green flag came out. Christian Fittipaldi went wide and Michael Andretti takes the lead. Meanwhile, Paul Tracy crashed very hard. Fifth full course caution. Few laps later, came the green flag.

1 lap after the restart
Scott Pruett caused the sixth full course caution as he crashed into the tyre barrier. Green flag came out with two minutes left.

Lap 72
As the race completed the 2-hour limit, Michael Andretti won the race on lap 72. 5 laps before the predicted laps.

Final results
Top 12
 Michael Andretti 72 laps
 Christian Fittipaldi
 Gil de Ferran
 Adrian Fernandez
 Mark Blundell
 Eddie Lawson
 Stefan Johansson
 Raul Boesel
 P. J. Jones
 Scott Pruett
 Alex Zanardi +1
 Jimmy Vasser +1

Drivers who did not completed the race
 Bobby Rahal +12 Contact
 Al Unser Jr. +26 Contact
 Roberto Moreno +31 Broken exhaust
 André Ribeiro +35 Contact
 Emerson Fittipaldi +36 Contact
 Robby Gordon +69 Contact

Did not started the race
 Michel Jourdain Jr. Too slow

Point standings
After 8 of 16 races
 Jimmy Vasser 98 points
 Al Unser Jr. 75 points
 Michael Andretti 71 points
 Christian Fittipaldi 58 points
 Gil de Ferran 55 points
 Scott Pruett 54 points

References

Detroit Indy Grand Prix
Detroit Grand Prix
ITT Automotive Grand Prix
1996 in Detroit
June 1996 sports events in the United States